Sport Lisboa e Benfica, commonly known as Benfica, created a swimming section in 1914, which had one of the most successful teams in Portugal. Benfica's most notable swimmer was Alexandre Yokochi, who competed for the club his entire career and was part of the swimming team who won the EEC European Champions Clubs Cup in 1990.

Apart from the individual titles and the ECC European Champions Clubs Cup, Benfica have won five Men's National Championships and one Women's National Championship.

Honours

Men's
 Portuguese Championship
 Winners (5): 1986–87, 1988–89, 1989–90, 1992–93, 1993–94

 Portuguese Second Division
 Winners: 2009–10

 ECC European Champions Clubs Cup
 Winners: 1989–90

Women's
 Portuguese Championship
 Winners: 1987–88

References

External links
  
 Pictures of Benfica's swimming pools

 
Swimming
1914 establishments in Portugal